Kornbühl is a mountain of Baden-Württemberg, Germany. It belongs to the Swabian Jura and is located in Zollernalbkreis near Burladingen. On its top the "Salmendinger Kapelle" is located.

Mountains and hills of the Swabian Jura
Burladingen